David Robert Ross (1797 – 27 July 1851) was an Irish Whig politician and army officer.

References

External links
 

UK MPs 1841–1847
Whig (British political party) MPs for Irish constituencies
1797 births
1851 deaths